Otjiherero grammar is the grammar of the Herero language (Otjiherero), a Bantu language spoken primarily in Namibia. It includes several hallmarks of Bantu languages such as a large number of noun classes and the use of subject concords.

Nouns 
Otjiherero includes the standard six personal pronouns, twenty-one noun classes for general nouns and three prepositions that can exhibit nominal properties.

General nouns 
Nearly every noun belongs to a noun class. Nine main noun classes and one rare noun class are present. Each has a subclass for singular nouns and plural nouns. Each noun class has its own demonstrative, object pronoun, object concord, relative concords, possessive prefix and pronoun.

A noun's class can be determined by its first few letters. This is the noun-class prefix, while the rest of the word is the noun stem. Singular and plural nouns have distinct noun-class prefixes. This differs from many western languages, which typically pluralize words by changing the end sounds—for example, by adding a sibilant ("s").

Some prefixes occur in multiple classes, such as omu and oma. Knowing which noun class that words with these prefixes belong to can often be guessed based on the type of word, but this is not always true.

Noun classes tend to have loose themes. These are not strict and any type of word may find itself in any noun class. The only noun class that strictly adheres to its theme is 1. sing, which all refer to a person or people.

An exception to the two-subclass system occurs in the oo- subclass. This subclass is the pluralization of nouns that do not have a noun-class prefix, which is rare. Examples of this include the pluralization of mama ("mom") into oomama, tate ("father") into ootate, or the pluralization of a name to refer to the person and those associated with them, such as Ukutura into ooUkutura. It is an alternative to ova, because it generally is used for people.

Most noun-class prefixes begin with the letter "o", including a noun class with just "o". This class encompasses all nouns that begin with "o" that do not belong to any other noun class.

One should note that Otjiherero has no articles.

Prepositional pronouns 

The prepositions pu, ku, and mu can sometimes be the subject of a sentence, and have their own subject concords similar to other noun classes. They can be thought of as the 11th, 12th and 13th noun classes. The division between pu and ku is sometimes indistinct, but some guidelines are included.

Personal pronouns 

Otjiherero personal pronouns are delineated into six pronouns based on person (1st, 2nd, 3rd) and plurality (singular, plural).

Impersonal pronouns 
Each noun class has a corresponding pronoun. From the perspective of an English speaker, for general nouns all of these are equivalent to "it" for singular subjects and "they" for plural subjects. For the prepositional noun classes, the pronouns are related to "here", "there", and "inside". Additionally, each class has demonstrative pronouns, comparable to "this/these one(s)", "that/those one(s)", and "that/those one(s) over there" in English.

Examples 
Oyo ye ya. It came.
Indji ye ya. This one came.

Verbs 
Like most languages, verbs conjugate to denote tense, aspect and modality. However, to know the correct tense, aspect, and modality of the sentence, the combination of the verb and the subject concord must be considered. Unlike English, verbs do not conjugate differently for different subjects.

Regular verbs have 3 main conjugations for tense:

 The infinitive
 The verb stem of the infinitive
 A main alternative conjugation

Infinitive conjugation 

All verbs in their infinitive conjugation begin with oku- and end with the letter -a. Oku- is the verb prefix, and the rest of the verb is the verb stem.

Examples:
 Okutona to hit
 Okuhungira to speak
 Okupenduka to wake up / get up
 Okurya to eat

Verbs can be used as nouns by treating them as nouns with the oku- noun-class prefix.

Example: Okutona kwoye eputi Your hitting is a problem

Verb stem conjugation 

In some tenses, the verb conjugates by dropping the verb prefix

Examples
 Mbi tona I hit
 U hungira You speak
 Tu penduka We wake up / get up
 Ve rya They eat

Main alternative conjugation 

All verbs have a main alternative conjugation. This alternative relates to the verb stem in one of four ways. The alternative conjugation is either:

 identical to the verb stem.
 the -a of the verb stem becomes an -e
 the -a of the verb stem becomes the vowel from the preceding syllable (called "vowel harmonization")
 irregular

Examples:
 Twa penduka We woke up / got up (Case 1)
 Mo hungire You are speaking (Case 2)
 Me tono I am hitting (Case 3)
 Matu ri We are eating (Case 4)

Other conjugations 

Other conjugations occur for location, voice, reflection, benefaction, and causation, as described below.

Location 

When an action occurs somewhere else, the directive particle ka is used. In non-command, non-infinitive cases, the verb is in verb stem form with a ka-  prefix.

Examples:
 Me katona I am going to go hit
 Mo kahungira You are going to go speak
 Twa kapenduka We went and woke up / got up
 Matu karya We are going to go eat

When used in a command, ka- is a prefix to the verb stem, but the last letter of the verb stem changes to -e (regardless of whether or not this is the verb's main alternative conjugation).

Examples:
 Katone Go hit
 Kahungire Go speak
 Kapenduke Go wake up / get up
 Karye Go eat

When used in an infinitive, -ka- is an infix between the verb prefix and the verb stem.

Examples:
 okukatona to go hit
 okukahungira to go speak
 okukapenduka to go wake up / get up
 okukarya to go eat

Passive voice 

Passive voice conjugations are formed by putting a -w- before the final -a of the verb stem (regardless of tense). Irregular verbs may use a form similar to their main alternative conjugation.

Examples:
 Me tonwa I'm being hit
 U hungirwa You are spoken to
 Twa riwa We were eaten

To specify an acting object, the passive particle i comes before the object.

Examples:
 Me tonwa i omiṱiri I'm being hit by a teacher
 U hungirwa i ovanene You are spoken to by adults
 Twa riwa i ozongeyama We were eaten by lions

Reflection 

The reflective particle ri expresses a subject doing something to itself. This same effect is achieved in English by adding "-self/-selves" to the object, such as in "herself" or "themselves". The reflective particle appears exactly as does the directive particle (see "Location" above). In the case that a verb uses both a reflective particle and a directive particle, the directive precedes the reflective. Unlike the directive, the reflective does not cause verbs to switch to verb stem form regardless of tense.

The reflective particle affects preceding concords and directive particles. If any of these parts of speech end with an -a, the -a changes to an -e.

In the final example the reflective particle influenced both the subject concord and the directive particle.

Benefactive 

When an action is done for or on behalf of someone/something else, a benefactive suffix is sometimes used. The four benefactive suffixes are:

 -ena
 -era
 -ina
 -ira

The suffix depends on the end of the verb stem. 

 If the second-to-last vowel of the verb is an -a-, -e-, or -o-, the first letter of the benefactive suffix is an -e-. Otherwise, it is an -i-.
 If the last consonant of the verb is an m, n, or ṋ, the second letter of the benefactive suffix with be an -n-. Otherwise it is an -r-.

The benefactive suffix replaces the -a of the verb stem. In tenses where using the main alternative verb form, the final -a of the benefactive suffix becomes an -e (regardless of the final letter of the main alternative verb form for that verb).

Examples:
 Mbi ungura. I work.
 Mbi ungurira oPeaceCorpsa. I work for Peace Corps.
 Me ziki. I'm cooking.
 Me zikire Muharukua. I'm cooking for Muharukua.
 Mba nyanda. I played.
 Mba nyandere Okorosave. I played for Okorosave.

Causation 

In the case that the subject causes the object to do the action, a causatory suffix is added to the verb. The most common suffix is to replace the final -a of the verb with -isa. However, verbs ending in -uka can sometimes change the -uka to -ura and achieve a similar effect.

When forming passive voice with causatory verbs, an -iwa is added rather than a -wa

Examples:
 ungurisiwa to be used
 hitisiwa to be made to enter

Subject concords (and tense construction) 

Unlike English, every verb (except commands or infinitives) is preceded by a part of speech called a subject concord. Subject concords are similar to helping (auxiliary) verbs in English, except that they have no meaning without an accompanying verb, whereas helping verbs such as "was" could be used as a verb in certain sentences. Subject concords inflect to denote tense, aspect and modality, but unlike Otjiherero verbs, subject concords also inflect to show subject. Often the subject concord implies the subject with little or no ambiguity, such that subject nouns and pronouns are often omitted.

The concepts of "verb stem conjugation" and "main alternative conjugation" succinctly describe verb conjugation in many cases. Since subject concords vary depending by subject, some noun notation is also used.

Subject concords carry the negation sentences. In other words, verbs that "didn't happen" use a different subject concord. Note that some tenses exist only positively or only negatively.

Present and future tenses 

Otjiherero has five tenses that occur in the present or future time frames. 

 Present Habitual Tense
 Copulative / Associative Tense
 Present Progressive / Near Future Tense
 Indefinite Future Tense
 Present Perfect Tense

Present habitual tense 

The present habitual tense is used for actions that occur regularly, emphasizing the ongoing recurrence of the action rather than any specific occurrence.

The following formula describes the formation of this tense:

(optional pronoun/name/noun) + present habitual subject concord + verb stem conjugation

Examples:
Mbi honga ovivarero. I teach math.
Maveja u kara kOkahandja. Maveja stays (lives) in Okahandja.

The following formula describes the negation of this tense:

(optional pronoun/name/noun) + negative present habitual subject concord + main alternative conjugation

Examples:
Kave koho ozombanda. They don't wash clothes.
Ami hi ri onyama. I don't eat meat.

Copulative/associative present tense 

Otjiherero includes two special words that have unique parts of speech: the copula, ri, and the associative, na. These correlate with the English verbs "to be" and "to have"/"to be with", respectively (but ri and na are not considered verbs).

Regardless of whether these are used in present progressive situations or habitual situations, they always use the habitual subject concord when used in the present tense. This is similar to English, where "I am happy." and "I have a pencil." are much more common than "I'm being happy." and "I'm having a pencil.", even when used in a present progressive context.

Ri finds its main uses in present tense when used to
define a location, or
use certain adverbs

The following formula describes the formation of this tense:

(optional pronoun/name/noun) + habitual subject concord + ri + adverb OR preposition+location OR pi? ("where?")

Examples:
Ami mbi ri nawa. I'm not well.
Tjahere u ri pi? Where is Tjahere?
Tjahere u ri kOtjiwarongo. Tjahere is in Otjiwarongo.

When used with the interrogative pi, the ri is sometimes omitted as a contraction.

Examples:
Tjahere u pi? Where is Tjahere?
Tji pi? Where is it? (the "it" understood by context and knowledge that tji is in the ovi noun class)

The following formula describes the negation of this tense:

(optional pronoun/name/noun) + negative habitual subject concord + ri + adverb OR preposition+location

Examples:
Ami hi ri nawa. I'm not well.
Ovanatje kave ri kOtjiwarongo. The children aren't in Otjiwarongo.

Na is generally used to show association or possession. The associative usually prefixes the noun, almost always dropping the a if the noun begins with a vowel.

The following formula describes the formation of this tense:

(optional pronoun/name/noun) + habitual subject concord + (n(a)+noun)

Examples:
Mbi nozombura omirongo vivari. I have twenty years. (I'm twenty years old.)
U notjipaturure? Do you have the key?

The following formula describes the negation of this tense:

(optional pronoun/name/noun) + negative habitual subject concord + (n(a)+noun)

Examples:
Hi nozombura omirongo vivari. I don't have twenty years. (I'm not twenty years old.)
Ko notjipaturure. You don't have the key.

Present progressive/near future tense 

Verbs for events that are happening in the current moment are usually conjugated in this tense, though some verbs are conjugated in the recent past tense. Verbs for events that take place in the arbitrarily "near" future are conjugated in this tense.

The following formula describes the formation of this tense:

(optional pronoun/name/noun) + present progressive / near future subject concord + main alternative conjugation

Examples:
Me ya nambano I'm coming now.
Matu kondo ovirongo We're crossing towns/villages. (travelling/visiting)

The following formula describes the negation of this tense:

(optional pronoun/name/noun) + negative present progressive / near future subject concord U verb stem conjugation

Examples:
Ko nakuyenda? You're not going?
Ozongombe kaze nakunwa kotjitoto. The cows aren't going to drink at the hole.

Indefinite future tense 

Actions that take place in some indefinitely distant future are generally conjugated in this tense.

The following formula describes the formation of this tense:

(optional pronoun/name/noun) + indefinite future subject concord + main alternative conjugation

Examples:
Mokurooro maatu karya ozombe In the summer, we will go eat berries.
Mee i koAmerica I will go to America.

The following formula describes the negation of this tense:

(optional pronoun/name/noun) + negative indefinite future subject concord + main alternative conjugation

Examples:
Kamaatu zembi We will not forget.
Himee koho ozombanda. I will not wash clothes.

Present perfect 

This tense is only strictly defined for negations. It can be interpreted in English as "haven't/hasn't" or "still haven't/hasn't"

The following formula describes the negation of this tense:

(optional pronoun/name/noun) + negative present perfect subject concord + verb stem conjugation

Examples:
Hi ya zuva. I haven't heard.
Ke ya honga. He hasn't taught.

Past tenses 

In Otjiherero, the majority of tenses occur in the past. These include

Recent Past
Yesterday's/Completed Past
Intermediately Distant Past
Very Distant Past
General Non-Recent Past
Past Continuous
Past Habitual
Copulative / Associative Past

Recent past 

The recent past tense includes most verbs that were performed earlier in the same day.

The following formula describes the formation of this tense:

(optional pronoun/name/noun) + general past subject concord + main alternative conjugation

Examples:
Simbuli wa i kOpuwo. Simbuli went to Opuwo.
Mba zuu. I understood.

Some verbs that are still occurring use the recent past tense. This tense captures an initiation or transition occurring at the beginning of the action, and that the action is grammatically understood to still be taking place; however, similar verbs are not always conjugated in the same tense.

Examples:
Eye wa rara. He/She is sleeping. (He/She fell asleep)
Mba handja. I'm mad. (I became mad.)

yet some similar verbs are conjugated in the present progressive tense

Me vanga. I want.
Mave tira. They are afraid.

There is no negation for this tense, as negations will either migrate into the present perfect or yesterday's / completed past tense.

Yesterday/completed past 

Events of a day or a few days ago usually use verbs conjugated in this tense.

The following formula describes the formation of this tense:

(optional pronoun/name/noun) + general past subject concord + verb stem conjugation with behalvatory suffix(!)

Some irregular verbs, such as okurya, do not use the verb stem conjugation. Behalvatory suffixes are used instead.

Examples:
Ove wa manene oviungura vyoye. You finished your work.
Twa kunine ozomiriva. We planted corn.

Verbs that use the recent past conjugation to indicate that they are presently occurring use yesterday's/completed past to show completion, even if they happened in the current day.

Examples:
Ovanatje va rarere. The children slept. / The children fell asleep. (but they're not asleep anymore) (earlier today)
Mba handjere. I was mad. / I became mad. (but I'm not mad anymore) (earlier today)

This tense has no negation,This tense has no negation, as negations for non-recent past use the "general non-recent past" tense.

Intermediately distant past 

Actions not performed yesterday-ish but not distantly past fall in this intermediate category.

The following formula describes the formation of this tense:

(optional pronoun/name/noun) + general past subject concord + verb stem conjugation

Examples:
Mba honga. I taught. (not yesterday, but not in the far, far past.)
Ovanatje va koha ozombanda . The children washed clothes (not yesterday, but not in the far, far past.)

This tense has no negation, as negations for non-recent past use the "general non-recent past" tense.

Very distant past 

This tense represents the greatest possible emphasis on a distant time. The formation of this tense is exactly the same as that of yesterday's past, but the verbs have an up-accent on the final vowel. This tense has no negation, as negations for non-recent past use the "general non-recent past" tense.

General non-recent past 

This tense is used only in the negative and encompasses the negations of the "Yesterday/completed past", "Intermediately distant past", and "Verb distant past" tenses.

The following formula describes the negation of this tense:

(optional pronoun/name/noun) + negative habitual subject concord + verb stem conjugation with behalvatory suffix(!)

(!) Some irregular verbs, such as okurya, do not use the verb stem conjugation. 

Examples:
Hi tupikire. I didn't run.
Ovanatje kave nyandere. The children didn't play.

Past continuous 

To emphasize the extended duration of an action in the past, the past continuous tense is used. This is the same as saying "I was playing." instead of "I played."

The following formula describes the formation of this tense:

(optional pronoun/name/noun) + general past subject concord + ri + (a- + the subject concord you'd use if you were doing the action right now. Thus usually the present progressive subject concord, but for some verbs this would be the general past subject concord.) + main alternative conjugation

Examples:
Mba ri ame nyanda. I was playing.
Ovanatje va ri amave koho ozombanda. The children were washing clothes.

This tense is especially useful for saying that something happened while something else was happening.

Examples:
Mama wandje we ndji tonene ongoze tji mba ri ame i. My mother called me while I was leaving.
Mba zikire omariro womuhuka omunene ove tji wa ri awa rara. I cooked breakfast while you were sleeping.

For the third person singular, certain contractions may be used.
Kauarive wa ri ama kondjisa omusuko. Kauarive was flirting with the young girl. (theoretical non-contracted sentence)
Kauarive wa ri aa kondjisa omusuko. (partially contracted)
Kauarive wa raa kondjisa omusuko. (standard form)

The conjunction ngunda ("while") is also used in the past continuous tense.

The following formula describes the formation of this tense:

(optional pronoun/name/noun) + ngunda + (a- + the subject concord you'd use if you were doing the action right now. Thus usually the present progressive subject concord, but for some verbs this would be the general past subject concord.) + main alternative conjugation

In other words, ngunda can replace the general past subject concord and the ri.

Examples:
Mama wandje we ndji tonene ongoze ngunda ame i. My mother called me while I was leaving.
Mba zikire omariro womuhuka omunene ove ngunda awa rara. I cooked breakfast while you were sleeping.

The following formula describes the negation of this tense:

(optional pronoun/name/noun) + past copulative subject concord + ri + (a- + the subject concord you'd use if you were doing the action right now. Thus usually the present progressive subject concord, but for some verbs this would be the general past subject concord.) + main alternative conjugation

Examples:
Himba ri ame nyanda. I wasn't playing.
Ovanatje kava ri amave koho ozombanda. The children weren't washing clothes.

Past habitual 

Actions that once took place habitually but no longer take do so adopt the past habitual tense. This can be compared to "used to" in English.

The following formula describes the formation of this tense:

(optional pronoun/name/noun) + past habitual subject concord + verb stem conjugation

Examples:
Ozongombe aaze kara mokuti. Cows used to live in the wilderness.
Ami ee nyanda, nambano hi nyanda rukwao. I used to play, now I don't play anymore.

The following formula describes the negation of this tense:

(optional pronoun/name/noun) + negative past habitual subject concord + verb stem conjugation

Examples:
Ozongombe kaaze kara mokuti. Cows didn't used to live in the wilderness.
Ami hee nyanda, nambano mbi nyanda. I didn't used to play, now I play.

Copulative/associative past 

To use the Otjiherero copula ri in the past tense, the copulative past conjugation is used (unless in the past habitual). This is required when:
Using past continuous (described above)
Using ri to identify one noun with another noun in the past
Using na/n- to show association in the past

The following formula describes the formation of this tense:

(optional pronoun/name/noun) + general past subject concord + ri + (noun OR (na/n-+noun))

Examples:
Mba ri omiṱiri. I was a teacher.
Mba ri nokati. I had a stick.

The following formula describes the negation of this tense:

(optional pronoun/name/noun) + negative copulative past subject concord + ri + (noun OR (na/n-+noun))

Examples:
Himba ri omiṱiri. I wasn't a teacher.
Himba ri nokati. I didn't have a stick.

In the case of the copula ri in a past habitual tense, the conjugation proceeds in the habitual tense style.

Examples:
Ee ri omiṱiri. I used to be teacher.
Hee ri nokati. I didn't used to have a stick.

Object Concords

Other than when used in possessive determiners, pronouns are rarely used as objects. Instead, Otjiherero speakers use object concords, which replace object pronouns with no change in meaning. Each personal pronoun and noun class has its own object concord

These are the same as the present habitual subject concords for each noun class respectively, as well as some impersonal pronouns. The excepted noun class is class 1s, where the object concord corresponds with that of the third person singular personal pronoun, eye.

Unless involved in a sentence with a verb in the infinitive form, object concords situate themselves directly before the verb. When the verb is in the infinitive form, the object concord is infixed between the oku- and the verb stem. If a directive particle is also being used, the object concord is infixed between the directive particle and the verb stem.

Object concords are one of several grammatical constructs that cause -as of preceding parts of speech to change into -es. They are able to affect subject concords, directive particles and relative concords.

Examples:
Ove we ndji pe ovikurya. You gave me food.
Matu ku vatere. We are helping you.
Me mu raere. I/He/She will tell him/her/you pl..
We ze munu pi? Where did you see them? (some mutually understood noun from the ozo- noun class)
Oviṋa vyoye matu vi paha. We are looking for your things.
[Okambihi] mbe ke zepa. I killed it [the cat].
[Okambihi] me vanga okukezepa. I want to kill it [the cat].
[Ngurije] me sokumupaha. I must look for her [Ngurije]
[Okambihi] me vanga okukekezepa. I want to go kill it [the cat].
[Ngurije] me sokukemupaha. I must go look for her [Ngurije].
Omundu ngwe ku tono u ri pi? Where is the person who hit you?

Ambiguity is created in the third example by the inclusion of an object concord. It is possible that native speakers could determine the exact meaning of the sentence by the tone of me and mu. For non-native speakers or written Otjiherero, including pronouns can clarify neaning.

Examples:

Eye, Ami me mu raere. I will tell him/her.

Relative Concords

Relative concords cause a verb or verb phrase to act as an adjective. They are comparable to "that", "which" and "who" in English. They come after the subject and replace the subject concord of the verb phrase.

Basic

Basic relative concords come after the subject and replace the subject concord of the verb phrase. With a copula ri, associative na or both, they come after the relative concord.

Compare:
Omuatje wa tono ombwa yandje The child hit my dog
Omuatje ngwa tono ombwa yandje The child who hit my dog

Examples:
Ovanatje mbe nyanda otjimbere ve ri pi? Where are the children that play soccer?
Toneye ozondana nḓu maze nyamu! Hit the calves that are breast-feeding!
Ovandu mbe nozombanda mave nyanda. The people who have clothes are playing.
Ovanadu mba ri nozombanda mave nyanda. The people who had clothes are playing.
Orukuṋe ndu ri pekuma ru rira ndu ri pezuko. The firewood which is in the wood holder becomes (the wood) which is in the fire.

Different subject

If the subject of the action in the relative verb phrase is different from the original subject, the following formula is used:

[First word of the present progressive relative concord] + [tense-appropriate subject concord for the relative subject]

Compare:
Ombwa ndja suvera The dog that loves (Dog is the initial subject and the subject that "loves" in the relative verb phrase)
Ombwa ndji mba suvera The dog that I love (Dog is the initial subject, but "I" is the subject that "loves" in the relative verb phrase)

Examples:
Ryanga u mune oviṋa mbi u zuva uriri. Visit around so that you can see the things which you only hear about.
Oove omundu ngu me vanga. You are the person who I like.

Negation

To negate the present habitual, the negatory particle ha follows the habitual relative concord. The verb is conjugated in the main alternative form.

To negate in the present progressive, replace the second word of the present progressive relative concord with hi naku-. The verb is conjugated in the verb stem form.

To negate with na or ri in the present, insert he between the habitual relative concord and the na or ri.

Examples:
Omuatje ngu ha ungura ka vangwa. The child who doesn't work isn't wanted.
Ami me tono omuatje ngu hi nakuungura. I'm going to hit the child who isn't working.
Ami me tono omuatje ngu he nozombanda. I'm going to hit the child who doesn't have clothes.
Ame me tono omuatje ngu he ri metuwo. I'm going to hit the child who isn't in the room.

Adjectives

Similar to  nouns, all standard adjectives have a noun-class prefix and an adjective stem. Unlike nouns, adjectives do not have invariable prefixes that are essential to their meaning. Instead, adjectives inherit the noun-class prefix of the noun they describe. Thus, since a part of an adjective depends on the subject it is modifying, standard adjectives cannot be written without implying a subject (or a possible set of subjects). However, since the adjective stem remains the same regardless of subject, it is useful to use adjective stems as a way to record adjectives.

Standard Adjectives 

Standard adjectives usually come after nouns, and consist of a noun-class prefix and an adjective stem.

Examples:
Tara omundu omunene. Look at the big person.
Tara ekopi enene. Look at the big cup.
Tara orutuwo orunene. Look at the big spoon.

Comparatives 

Adjectives are not declined to show comparison, such as "big" becoming "bigger". Instead, the preposition pu is added as a prefix to the noun to which the initial noun is compared. Pu almost always omits the u when prefixed to a noun beginning with a vowel, which most do. Exceptions include loanwords that are proper nouns.

Examples:
Ombwa onene pomuautje. The dog is bigger than the child.
Tjiuri u nozondunge puMojao. Tjiuri is more clever than Mojao.
Otjitarazu omure pEtengarindi. December is longer than February. (Here the adjective uses the omu- prefix in order imply omueze, meaning "month")

Superlatives 

Superlatives can be formed in two ways. The first is to double the last two syllables of the adjective stem, or in the case of single syllable adjective stems, double the adjective stem

Examples:
Muniehi omurere moklasa. Muniehi is the tallest in the class.
Eye wa haama motjihavero otjinenenene. He/She sat in the biggest chair.
Owami omunazondungendunge. I'm the most clever.

The other approach to superlatives is formed like comparatives, except tjinene is added after the adjective, and a form of "all" is placed after the compared group. While these may arguably be comparatives, the addition of tjinene indicates a unique form.

Examples:
Munieji omure tjinene povanatje avehe moklasa. Muniehi is taller than all the children in the class.
Eye wa haama motjihavero otjinene tjinene povihavero avihe. She/He sat in the chair bigger than all the chairs.
Owami omunazondunge tjinene povandu avehe. I'm more clever than all the people.

Using relative concords 

Otjiherero has few adjectives compared to English. Similar to English, relative concords are used to modify a noun when the adjective doesn't exist.

Compare:
Ombwa ya urwa The dog is tired (There is no adjective stem for "tired", but there is a verb)
Ombwa ndja urwa The tired dog / The dog which is tired (Using the relative concord ndja, "tired" acts as an adjective rather than a verb)

Adverbs 

Otjiherero has no formula for changing adjectives to adverbs. English converts many adjectives to adverbs by adding "-ly".

Extended adverbs

For situations where a verb, adjective, or adverb must be modified in a way that no existing adverb allows, an extended adverb may be created by using the following formula:

verb + a- + [subject concord and verb modifying the original verb]

This is comparable to "while" in English. Note that verbs that normally use recent past subject concords to describe the present tense use a recent past concord. All other verbs use present progressive subject concords.

Examples:
Ami mbe mu undura amba pindike. I pushed him angrily. / I pushed him while angry.
Ove we mu undura awa pindike. You pushed him angrily. / You pushed him while angry.
Eye we mu undura a pinkike. She pushed him angrily. / She pushed him while angry. (notice that eye/omu- has this grammatical exception for past tense)
Ami mbe ku munu ame tupuka. I saw you while I was running.
Ove we ndji munu amo tupuka. You saw me while you were running.

Conjunctive adverbs

One important conjunctive adverb is nu, meaning "then" or "and then". If followed by a word that starts with a vowel, the nu is often dropped, and the n- becomesa prefix to the word. If followed by wa or we, the past subject concord for third person singular personal nouns/pronouns, the u and w are dropped, and the words combine to na or ne

Examples:
Ovandu vevari va vanga okuvaka, nowo [nu owo] ave kamburwa. Two people wanted to steal, and then they were caught.
Omuatje wa ri ama tupuka na [nu wa] u. The child was running and then fell.
Omukazendu wa toora omuatje ne mu pukata. The woman picked up the child and sat him on her lap.

Determiners 

Otjiherero makes use of the following determiners:

Demonstratives
Possessives
Quantifiers
Cardinal Numbers
Ordinal Numbers

Most notably omitted when compared to English are articles, which are compensated for by context or demonstratives

Demonstratives 

Each noun class has its own demonstratives, and the demonstrative corresponds to the noun class of the noun it refers to. Some noun classes have multiple demonstratives in use due to generational or regional differences. These are represented by fields with multiple entries. The oru- and otu- classes specifically have a wide range of demonstratives in use, and not all possibilities are listed.

Demonstratives can be positioned before or after their corresponding noun. When positioned after, they are used exactly as in the table. When written before the noun, an i- is prefixed to the demonstrative.

Examples:
omuatje ngwi this child
ingwi omuatje this child
otjiṋa ho that thing
iho otjiṋa that thing
ozondundu nḓena those hills over there
inḓena ozondundu those hills over there

A common usage of demonstratives involves placing them directly after a corresponding pronoun. This creates a new meaning, along the lines of "Here it is / There it is / There it is over there" or "It's this one here / It's that one there / It's that one over there"

Examples:
"Ongombe i ri pi?" "Oyo ndji." "Where is the cow?" "Here it is."
"Simbuli u ri pi?" "Eye ngo." "Where is Simbuli?" "There she is."
"Zaongara u ri pi?" "Owami ngwi." "Where is Zaongara?" "I'm here."

Demonstratives can stand alone as demonstrative pronouns.

Possessives 

Possessive determiners are composed of two parts: a possessive concord that is prefixed to a possessive suffix. Possessive concords correspond to the noun class of the noun being possessed, while the possessive suffix corresponds to the noun class of the possessor.

Exception: omuṱena (opposite-sex sibling) has an irregular possessive concord, using kwa- instead of wa-

The possessive suffix can take four different forms, creating four different classes of possessive determiners
Personal Pronoun Possessive Determiners
Proper Noun Possessive Determiners
Common Noun Possessive Determiners
Impersonal Pronoun Possessive Determiners

Personal pronoun possessive determiners 

Personal pronoun possessive determiners are possessive determiners with a personal pronoun (or noun from the first noun class) doing the possessing. For these, the suffix is a personal possessive pronoun.

The final a of the possessive concord is dropped when the possessive determiner is formed. Also note that possessors in the first noun class, omu/ova are treated as eye/ova respectively.

Examples:
Eta embo randje. Give me my book (the book of mine).
Eye nomukazendu we. He and his wife (the wife of his).
Omurumendu nomukazendu we. A man and his wife (the wife of his).
Ovaherero nozongombo zawo. The Hereros and their goats (the goats of theirs).

Proper noun possessive determiners 

When a proper noun is possessing, the possessive concord is prefixed to the proper noun. Two types of inflection are possible:
If the proper noun has a noun class (example: Okahandja) the first letter of the proper noun is dropped
If the proper noun does not have a noun class, no letters are dropped

Examples:
embo raAnna Anna's book (the book of Anna)
ovandu vaKahandja people of Okahandja
omundu waMama Mother's person (meaning you're related)
ozongombo zaTate Father's goats (goats of Father)

Common noun possessive determiners 

When a common noun is the possessor, the -a of the possessive concord is dropped.

Example:
otjipaturure tjomberoo office key (key of the office)

Impersonal pronoun possessive determiners 

When an impersonal pronoun is the possessor, the -o of the impersonal pronoun is dropped.

Example:
otjipaturure tjayo its key ("it" quite possibly referring to "office", as "omberoo" is in the o- noun class and would thus use the oyo pronoun)

Quantifiers 

Important quantifiers include tjiva (some), -arwe (other, another, different), -kwao (another), o- -ngi (many, most) and a- -he (all).

Some 

Tjiva expresses the idea of "some". Tjiva appears after the noun like a standard adjective, but does not inflect.

Example:
Mba munu ozongombe tjiva. I saw some cows.

Other, another, different 

-arwe expresses the idea of "other", "another" or "different". -arwe is prefixed with the possessive prefix of its noun, with the a- of the possessive prefix dropped. -arwe is similar to -kwao, but -arwe can imply difference, while -kwao almost always means "another".

Examples:
omundu warwe another person / other person / a different person
eyuva rarwe another day / other day (not today)

Another 

-kwao means "another". It inflects as a standard adjective. -arwe is similar to -kwao, but -arwe can be used to imply difference, while -kwao almost always means "another".

-arwe and -kwao can be confusing to English speakers because they often use "another" for two different ideas. One use involves addition, while another involves replacement.

Compare:
Ngatu ungure eyuva ekwao. Let's work another day. (in addition to today)
Ngatu ungure eyuva rarwe. Let's work another day. (instead of today)

Many, most 

o- -ngi expresses the idea of "many" (and sometimes "most"). It does not inflect as a standard adjective; rather, the present habitual subject concord of the modified noun is infixed between the o- and the -ngi.

Examples:
 ovandu ovengi many people
 otumwe otungi many mosquitoes

All 

a- -he expresses the idea of "all". It does not inflect as a standard adjective; rather, the present habitual subject concord of the modified noun is infixed between the a- and the -he.

Examples
 ovandu avehe all people
 otumwe atuhe all mosquitoes
 aruhe always, usually (short for oruveze aruhe, "all of the time")

Cardinal numbers

1 through 5 

For numbers 1 through 5, cardinal numbers work as standard adjectives, except number stems are prefixed with the present habitual subject concord of the noun they modify instead of the noun-class prefix.

The ozo- class inflects differently. Instead of accepting prefixes, the number stem stands alone. Moreover, number stems starting with v- change to mb- and number stems starting with t- change to nd-.

The number 4 has a few irregular inflections:
For the oma- noun class, 4 is prefixed with ya-, thus yane
For the ova- noun class, 4 is prefixed with va-, thus vane
For the ozo- noun class, 4 is prefixed with i-, thus ine

When using numbers in and of and themselves (not as modifiers), they are treated as if modifying a word in the ozo- class, except an i- is always prefixed (even beyond 5).

Examples:
omundu umwe one person
omapanga yetano five friends
ozongombe ndatu three cows
ozongombo ine four goats
imwe, imbari, indatu, ine, indano... one, two, three, four, five... (counting for the sake of counting)

6 through 10 

Numbers 6 through 10 do not inflect. Numbers 6 through 8 are simply 1 through 3 as if inflected for the ozo- noun class, with hambo- prefixed.

Examples:
omambo hambombari seven books
ozongombo hambombari seven goats

11 through 19 

Numbers 11 through 19 are formed through conjunction. For example, 15 is "ten and five". The number in the unit's place inflects normally as if it stood alone.

Examples:
otumwe omurongo na tutatu thirteen mosquitoes
ovirongo omurongo na vivari twelve towns

20 through 99 

Numbers 20 through 99 are also formed through conjunction. Multiples of 10 are created by treating 10 as a noun, and modifying it with a number 1 through 9.

Examples:
ozongombe omirongo vitano na ndatu fifty-three cows
ovandu omirongo muvyu na vetano ninety-five people

100 and beyond 

Numbers 100 and beyond are formed through conjunction, with each place value modified as a noun to create its multiples. Like English, place values of "thousand" and beyond are modified up to hundreds in order to create three places (example: thousands, ten thousands, hundred thousands; millions, ten millions, hundred millions)

Examples:
ozongombe omayovi hambombari, omasere yane nomirongo vivari na imwe seven thousand four hundred twenty-one cows
ovandu engete omayovi omasere yane omasere yevari nomirongo vitatu na vane one million four hundred thousand two hundred and thirty-four people

Ordinal numbers 

The following formula converts cardinal numbers to ordinal numbers

o + [present habitual concord of ordered noun] + tja + [number stem]

The exceptions are "first" and "last". These are constructed as standard adjectives, with -tenga as the adjective stem for "first", and -senina as the adjective stem for "last".

Examples:
embo etenga first book
oruveze orutjavari second time
ombapira oitjahambombari seventh paper
eyuva esenina last day

Other prefixes and particles

Negative prefix 

The prefix ka- can be used with nouns, adjectives and verbs in the infinitive form. It functions similar to "not" or "it's not a". When prefixed onto a work, the first vowel of the original is dropped if it began with a vowel. No ambiguity affects the directive prefix ka- because the directive prefix is only prefixed to verb stems, whereas the negative prefix prefixes to the beginning of the infinitive verb.

Examples:
kangombe it's not a cow / is not a cow
kamuatje it's not a child / is not a child
ongombe kanene the cow is not big / the not-big cow
Kanao. It's not like that (Nao. = like that)
Kakuhepa! Not thank you! / You weren't supposed to say thank you!

Negative particle 

The negative particle ha adds negation. It can be thought of as similar to "Not" "Non-" "Un-" "In-". It is normally used as an infix in adjectives and their derivatives (placed between the noun-class prefix and the noun stem) or as a particle before verbs in sentences asking "why" or with relative concords.

Compare:
-kohoke clean
oukohoke cleanliness
-hakohoke unclean
ouhakohoke uncleanliness

Examples:
Ongwaye ombi tji i ha tuka? Why doesn't the ostrich fly?
Omuatje ngu ungura ongu vangwa, ngu ha ungura ka vangwa. The child who works is the one who is wanted, [the child] who doesn't work isn't wanted

Nominal prefix 

The nominal prefix o- can be added to words to make them more independent. Main uses occur with personal pronouns, personal and impersonal noun-class possessives, relative concords and interrogatives. This works in 2 ways. 
cause the word to become a full noun
add a sense of "it is / is it?" or "they are the ones / are they?" to the word

Compare:
ozongombe zeṋe which cows (incomplete sentence)
Ozongombe ozeṋe. Which cows are they? / The cows are which ones? (complete sentence)

Compare:
uṋe who (incomplete sentence)
Ouṋe? Who is it (complete sentence)

Compare:
ekori raTate Father's hat (incomplete sentence)
Ekori oraTate. It is Father's hat. (complete sentence)

Examples:
Owami ngwi. I'm here (notice that for the special case of ami, a -w- is added)
Oove omundu ngu me vanga. You are the person who I like.
Omuatje ngu ungura ongu vangwa, ngu ha ungura ka vangwa. The child who works is the one who is wanted, [the child] who doesn't work isn't wanted.

Copulative particle 

The copula is ri. It functions similarly to "be/is/am/are" in English, although it is not a verb. Common uses include identifying with adverbs, querying location and specifying location. It can identify two nouns in the past. It comes up in the past continuous tense.

Examples:
Mbi ri nawa. I am fine.
Tjikuru u ri pi? Where is Grandma?
Eye u ri koskole. He/She is at school.

Associative particle 

The associative is na. It functions similar to "have" in English, thought it is not a verb. It is generally prefixed to a following noun, and drops its a- if the following noun begins with a vowel.

Examples:
Mbi nozombura omirongo vivari. I'm twenty years old. / I have twenty years.
Tjiuri u nozondunge. Tjiuri is clever. / Tjiuri has intelligence.
U notjipaturure? Do you have the key?
Mba ri nokati. I had a stick.

Conjunctions

Non-contrasting

The non-contrasting conjunction is na, similar to "and" in English.

If the following word begins with a vowel, the u is often dropped and the n- prefixed to the following word. Alternatively, sometimes the vowel of the following word is dropped, and the na- is prefixed to the word.

Examples:
Anna na Vehambana va ire kOpuwo. Ann and Vehambana went to Opuwo.
Anna nepanga re va ire kOpuwo. Ann and her friend went to Opuwo.

Contrasting

The fundamental contrasting conjunction is posi ya or posi ya kutja, meaning "but". Other forms include mara (loan word from Afrikaans); nungwari, which is more similar to "however"; and nangwari, which is similar to "however"/"actually".

Examples:
Twa vanga okuyenda pamwe, posi ya we ndji esa po. We wanted to go together, but she left me here.
Omuatje we ire kondjuwo, nagwari otjipaturure ka ri natjo. The child went to the house, however he didn't have the key.

Alternative

The conjunction for alternative is poo, meaning "or".

Example:
Oove Maria poo oove Anna? Are you Maria or are you Anna?

Consequential

The consequential conjunction is okutja, meaning "so"/"therefore".

Example:

Hi nakuvanga okuvera, okutja hi nakurya oLuncheon Rolla. I don't want to get sick, therefore I'm not going to eat a Luncheon Roll.

Subordinating Conjunctions

Correlative conjunctions

Prepositions

Otjiherero contains an assortment of prepositions. The most important are pu, ku, and mu.

Selected Prepositions

Pu, Ku, and Mu 

Pu, ku, and mu have special applications. The formal difference between pu and ku is obscure and the provided definitions do not always hold.

Pu, ku, and mu can behave like quasi-nouns. When used this way, they are able to have subject concords, demonstratives, relative concords and conditional concords.

These create situations similar to "there are" or "here is" in English

Examples:
Mondjuwo mamu nyanda ovanatje. In the house there are children playing.
Maku wondjo omundu omure. There walks a tall person.
Pomuvero pa rara omuatje. At the door there sleeps a child.

Example:
Indjo mba. Come here.

Example:
Omahongero, mu mwa za ozomiṱiri zetu. Education, in which our teachers come from.

Example:
Andaku ovandu ve ṱa nomana, katjaku kara ozofano. If people died with [their] names, there wouldn't be surnames.

Interrogatives 

Otjiherero contains an assortment of interrogatives. Ongwaye (why) is the most unusual.

Selected Interrogatives

Ongwaye 

Ongwaye has two uses. The first is a stand-alone word asking "what?", which could mean, for example, "what did you say?" or "what are you laughing at?". The second use is to ask "why?" questions. In these circumstances, it is always paired with tji. If the subject noun or pronoun is included in the sentence, it comes between ongwaye and tji. These constructions vary greatly between a positive question and a negative question.

Positive 

Positive constructions begin with ongwaye and tji. For the personal third person, the recent past subject concord wa combines with tji to form tja, and the habitual subject concord u will combine with tji to form tje.

Examples:
Ongwaye tji mo tjiti nao? Why are you (sing.) doing that? 
Ongwaye tji mamu pahere omunamuinyo movaṱi? Why are you (pl.) searching for a living person amongst dead people?
Ongwaye tje tupuka? Why does he run? 
Ongwaye tja tupuka? Why did he run? 
Ongwaye tji ma tupuka? Why is he running?

Negative 

Negatives in the recent past use the following formula:

ongwaye + [optional noun/pronoun] + tji + [habitual subject concord] + hi ya + [verb in "verb-stem" conjugation]

Example:
Ongwaye tje hi ya zika? Why did he not cook? (recently)

Negatives in the non-recent past use the following formula:

ongwaye + [optional noun/pronoun] + tji + [negative particle ha] + [verb in "yesterdays past" conjugation]

Example:
Ongwaye tje ha zikire? Why did he not cook? (non-recently)

Negatives in the habitual tense use the following formula:

ongwaye + [optional noun/pronoun] + tji + [habitual subject concord] + [negative particle ha] + [verb in "main alternative" conjugation]

Example:
Ongwaye ombo tji i ha tuka? Why doesn‘t the ostrich fly?

Negatives in the present progressive tense use the following formula:

ongwaye + [optional noun/pronoun] + tji + [habitual subject concord] +  hi naku–

Examples:
Ongwaye tji u hi nakuyenda? Why are you not going? 
Ongwaye tje hi nakutupuka? Why is he not running?

Other Moods

Otjiherero includes a variety of grammatical moods to express the speaker's attitude:

Conditional mood

The conditional mood can be subdivided into three subtypes. These can all be constructed with "if" in English.

Factual predictive

The factual and predictive conditional indicator is tji. It functions as "if/when" in English. Whether it functions more strongly as an "if" or a "when" is determined through context. Sentences are constructed similarly to English, except that if a noun/pronoun is included in the conditional statement, tji comes directly after the noun and before the subject concord. Negative forms take the grammatical structure of "why" questions formed with the interrogative ongwaye + tji.

Examples:
Matu hakaene ove tji mo vanga okurihonga Otjiherero. We will meet if/when you want to learn Otjiherero. 
Tji u hi nakuvanga, o ndji pe. If you don‘t want (to give me), don‘t give me.

Speculative

Speculative moods (speculating as to how things would be or would have been) are formed through a form of andakuzu and a conditional concord. As such, the speculated condition is always in the past or present tense, though the consequence could be in any tense

A less common, older style of positive conditional concords replaces the initial vowel with i-. For example, etje becomes itje, otjo becomes itjo, etc.

Examples:
Andakuzu kaweṱe mbu twa munu ihi otjipuka, eṋe katjamu kara na tji mamu ramba. If we hadn't seen this wild animal, you wouldn't have had (anything) which you chased.
Tjikuru, Oritjatano, tji mba ire kOkakarara, andaku ove we ndji pere ovimariva, e(tje) kaeterera oruhere. Grandma, Friday, when I went to Okakarara, if you would‘ve given me money, I would‘ve went and brought along porridge. 
Ripura uri, kutja eṱe omahupiro wetu atjaye rira tjike andakuzu eṱe katu hungire. Just think, that us our lifestyles would become what if we didn‘t talk. (Just think, what would our life be like if we didn‘t talk.) 
Andakuzu eṱe tu noskole, atjatu kahongisa omuatje wetu. If we had school (had education / had finished school), we would go make our child be taught (probably means, like, send him to a good school in Windhoek).

Sometimes andakuzu gets used twice, without the use of a conditional concord.

Andakuzu me riyozike omuini, andakuzu ondjozikiro yandje katjiṋa. If I honor myself, my honor would be nothing.

The conditional concord does not change with tense. Thus, the tense of the consequence must be determined through context. The following examples illustrate this. In these examples, the tense of the consequence is unknown unless it was previously established that the conversation took place.

Andakuzu hee vanga okuhonga moTerm1, etje yaruka moTerm1. If I wasn‘t wanting to teach during Term 1, I would‘ve gone back in Term 1. 
Andakuzu hee vanga okuhonga moTerm1, etje yaruka ndino. If I wasn‘t wanting to teach during Term 1, I would be going back today. [perhaps isn't allowed to go back until term 2, but had to decide during Term 1 whether or not to go back]
Andakuzu hee vanga okuhonga moTerm1, etje yaruka moTerm3. If I wasn‘t wanting to teach during Term 1, I would be going back in Term 3. [perhaps isn't allowed to go back until term 3, but had to decide during Term 1 whether or not to go back]

Dubitative

The dubitative mood indicates doubt. This mood is constructed by beginning the clause with ndovazu, ndaazu, ndeeri, or tjinangara. They are all nearly equivalent, with ndeeri sounding more childish and tjinangara sounding more poetic.

Examples:
Tjinangara oOve Omuna waNdjambi, raera omawe nga kutja ye rire ozomboroto. If it‘s really true that You are the Son of God, tell these stones to become bread. 
Tjinangara oOve Omuna waNdjambi, rurumina pehi, orondu Omatjangewa... If it‘s really true that You are the Son of God, throw yourself to the ground, for the scriptures...
Ndaazu ove mo i, okutja ami hi nakuyenda. If it‘s really true that you are going, I‘m not going. 
Ndeeri ove mo i, ami noho me i. If it‘s really true that you are going, I‘m going too. 
Ongwaye tjoo (tji+wa+ri+amo) paha opencila mondjaṱu ndeeri kai mo? Why were you searching for a pencil in the bag if it really wasn‘t in? [as in, the student told you earlier that the pencil wasn't in the bag, and now she's saying she was looking for it in the bag]

Subjunctive

The subjunctive mood is used to compose phrases such as "let us", "let it", "may it", or "it should". The subjunctive mood is constructed by simply replacing the subject concord with a subjunctive concord. The verb uses a special conjugation, using the verb stem conjugation with the final -a replaced with -e.

The subjunctive for ami is usedmostly  for questions. In these contexts, the meaning is similar to "can I?", "should I?" or "shall I?"

Examples:
Ngatu yende. Let's go. (in speech often sounds like Kati yende.)
Ngatu lese nokutjanga mOtjiherero. Let's read and write.
Ozombapira ngaze hindwe. Let the papers be sent.
Nge ye. Let him/her come. (not Nga ye. because ye is a form of okuya, which is a special verb in that it changes the -a of proceeding concords to -e)
Ngape tjitwe nao. May it be done that way.
Hi ye? Shall I come?
Hi ete? Shall I give?
Hi ku vatere? Can I help you?

Absolute negative

The absolute negative mood is similar to "never" or "ever" in English. Two distinct formulas comnunicate the absolute negative mood:

Negative habitual subject concord + na + pu + positive past subject concord

Examples:
Otjiṋa tji tja sana ngwi katji na pu tja tjitirwe moIsrael! Something like him has never happened in Israel!
Ozongu ndatu nḓo kaze na pu ze kemumuna rukwao. Those three bears never went and saw her again.

The second formula is

For personal pronouns or noun classes: Negative habitual subject concord+naa + positive past subject concord.

For non-personal noun classes: kanaa + positive past subject concord

Examples:
Ami hinaa mba ire. I never went.
Eye kenaa wea ire. He never went.
Epanga kanaa ra ire. The friend never went.
Otjipuka kanaa ya ire. The wild animal never went.
Hinaa mba ri nokati. Nambano mbi nokati. I never had a stick. Now I have a stick.

Intentional

The intentional mood is similar to "so that" or "in order to" in English. The intentional phrase follows a statement, question, or command to expand on the intent.

The formula for positive intentional sentences is:

[Statement, question, or command] + [positive intentional concord] + [verb in verb stem form, with final -a replaced with -e]

The formula for negative intentional sentences is:

Statement, question, or command] + [negative intentional concord] + [negative particle ha] + [verb in verb main alternative form]

Excepting third person singular personal positive concords (eye and omu personal classes), the positive intentional concords are the same as their class's positive habitual subject concords. For all negative concords, the negative intentional concords are the same as their class's positive progressive subject concords, with the initial m- dropped.

Kutja or kokutja can be inserted before the intentional concord for additional emphasis.

Examples:
Eta onyama mbi zike. Give me the meat so that I can cook.
Indjo mbi ku raere. Come so that I can tell you.
Anna we ya tu ungure pamwe. Anna came so that we could work together.
Toma wa i kostora ma rande ei. Tom went to the store in order to buy an egg.
Toma wa i kostora kutja ma rande ei. Tom went to the store in order to buy an egg.
Okuwa okurikarera kutja o ha hungire puna ovandu. It is good to stay alone so that you don't speak to people.
Ami mbe mu raere omambo nga, kokutja eṋe amu ha poka kongamburiro yeṋu. I have told you these words so that you don't break your faith.

Subsequentory

When narrating a series of actions, sometimes the subsequentory mood is used instead of the standard tense. This is constructed by using the progressive concord without the m- for all verbs after the first.

Examples:
Mo kanda ongombe, o twa omaihi mondjupa, o ṱuka. You milk the cow, then put the milk in the calabash, then shake.
Twa i kostora, atu i kombar. We went to the store, then we went to the bar.

Other grammatical occurrences

Commonly implied nouns (through concords, adjectives, or determiners)

Often a noun is omitted, implying that the noun class of the concord, adjective, or determiner is enough to make a reasonable assumption about the noun. Commonly implied word for come noun classes:

Constructing nouns from verbs 

Many nouns are similar to the verb that activates them. An example in English would be the similarity between "jog" and "jogger".

Verbs nominalized Into the omu-, ova-, otji-, ovi-, or ou class 

Typically, verbs nominalized into these noun classes replace the oku- of the infinitive verb with the noun-class prefix of the specified noun class. The last letter changes from -a to -e. People go into the omu- and ova- noun classes, concrete objects tend to be placed in the otji-/ovi- classes and more abstract nouns fall into the ou- class.

Examples:
okutunga to build => omutunge builder
okuhinga to drive => ovahinge drivers
okutjanga to write => otjitjange writing utensil
okutjitwa to be done => ovitjitwa events (done things) (an example where the final -a does not become -e
okuhepa to need => ouhepe poverty
okukohoka to become clean => ouhakohoke Uncleanliness (ha is the negative particle)

Verbs nominalized Into the oma- or o- class 

Typically, verbs nominalized into these noun classes replace the oku- of the infinitive verb with the noun-class prefix of the specified noun class. Their  last letter changes from -a to -ero, -iro, -eno or -ino. The suffix is determined by the same procedure as in "Yesterday/completed past", except the last letter is -o instead of -e. Many transitions to the o- class are effected by extra changes, as discussed in "Moving words to the o- and ozo- classes" below.

Examples:
okuhonga to teach => omahongero education
okumwina to be quiet => omamwinino silence
okuzira to answer => omaziriro answers
okupingena to replace => ombingeneno replacement
okukambura to believe => ongamburiro trust
okupandjara to be lost => ombandjarero loss, damnation

Constructing verbs from adjectives ("verbing") 

Although rare, some adjectives can become verbs by adding the oku- prefix and adding -para at the end.

Examples:
-nene big => okunenepara to become big
-hona ruling => okuhonapara to rule over

Constructing adjectives from verbs 

Adjectivizing verbs is widespread, constructed by removing the noun-class prefix and changing the final -a to an -e.

Examples:
okukohoka to become clean => -kohoke clean
okuhepa to need => -hepe needed

Moving words to the o- and ozo- classes 

When a noun stem, verb stem, or adjective stem beginning with w-, t-, z-, k-, v-, p-, t-, y-, or tj- is used in the o- or ozo- noun class, the first letters of the stem change.

The reverse change can happen for words that originate from o- or ozo- noun class.

Examples:
ombaze foot => okapaze little foot
onḓu sheep => okazu little sheep

Checking for knowledge/understanding 

The formula for asking if someone knows about something is:

[present habitual subject concord] + [object concord] + i

Examples:
Oruzo u ru i? Do you know what oruzo is?
Anna ko mu i? Do you not know Ann?
Okupunda Omuhiva u ku i? Do you know how to dance the Omuhiva?
Opencila ko i i? Do you not know what a pencil is?

Situations where the -a of a concord, directive prefix, or noun class becomes an -e 

Some grammatical situations cause the ending -a of a concord, directive prefix, or noun class to become -e. These situations are:
Reflexive particles, ri-
Object concords
The verbs okuya, okukuka, okukura, okuura, and okukuta. (okukuta can mean "to satiate hunger" or "to fasten". When used as "to fasten", this discussion does not apply.)

Examples:
Ozondjise zandje ze kuru tjinene. My hair grew a lot.
Zaongara me ya nambano. Zaongara is coming now.
We kuta? Are you full (hunger)?
Eṱe twe rihonogo. We learned.
Omerihongero. Learning (noun). (Nouns constructed from verbs like this would otherwise start with oma-. Note that the noun still behaves as a noun in the oma- noun class.)
Eṱe twe ku raere. We told you.
Me kerikoha. I will go bathe.
Me kemuraere. I will go tell him/her.

References 

Herero language
Niger-Congo grammars